The Republic of Zakopane (or Commonwealth of Zakopane) refers to an area in Galicia centered on the city of Zakopane that created its own parliament ("National Organisation") on October 13, 1918. The parliament's principal goal was to join an independent state of Poland. On October 30, the Organisation officially declared its independence from Austria-Hungary and, two days later, made itself a "National Council". This was eventually disestablished on November 16 when the Polish Liquidation Committee took control of Galicia.

The Republic's only president was the Polish writer Stefan Żeromski.

See also
Goralenvolk

References

 

Zakopane
States and territories established in 1918
States and territories disestablished in 1918
Zakopane